On 8 May 1842, a train crashed in the cutting between Meudon and Bellevue stations on the railway between Versailles and Paris, France. The train was travelling to Paris when it derailed after the leading locomotive broke an axle, and the carriages behind piled into it and caught fire. It was the first French railway accident and the deadliest in the world at the time, causing between 52 and 200 deaths, including that of explorer Jules Dumont d'Urville. The accident led the French to abandon the practice of locking passengers in their carriages.

Metal fatigue was poorly understood at the time and the accident led to systematic research into the problem.

Derailment and fire

By the late afternoon of Sunday 8 May 1842, the public celebrations being held in honour of king Louis Philippe I's saint's day in the Gardens of Versailles had finished and many people wished to return to Paris. At 5:30 pm a train left the Rive Gauche Versailles railway station for Paris Montparnasse. When the second locomotive and the carriages continued over the derailed locomotive, the carriages caught fire, trapping the passengers. The passengers were locked in their compartments as was the custom in continental Europe at the time.

The fire was so intense that the number of fatalities could not be determined, with estimates varying between 52 and 200, and hundreds of people were seriously injured. Among the deaths was the explorer Jules Dumont d'Urville and his family; his remains were identified by a sculptor from a cast he had made of the skull.

Some religious groups said the passengers had been punished for travelling on a Sunday. A chapel named "Notre-Dame-des-Flammes" (English: Our Lady of the Flames) was built in Meudon in memory of the victims; this was listed as a Monument historique in 1938, but delisted in 1959 and demolished soon after.

Legacy
This was the worst rail disaster in the world at the time. The accident led to the abandonment of the practice of locking passengers in their carriages in France. The French government appointed a commission to investigate the accident; this recommended testing axles to determine their service life and monitoring their usage so that they could be replaced after travelling a safe distance.

Metal fatigue was poorly understood at the time and the accident is linked to the beginnings of systematic research into the problem. Work by H. H. Edwards, William Rankine, William Fairbairn and others described the fatigue process and Rankine developed a solution for railway axles.  Later, during 1856 to 1870, the work of August Wöhler would help to improve testing of axles, and so increase axle life.

Notes

References

Citations

Sources

 George Sendeckiyj (2006). "Early Railroad Accidents and the Origins of research on fatigue of metals", Appendix A of

Further reading

External links 
 

Engineering failures
Derailments in France
Railway accidents in 1842
1842 in France
Transport in Hauts-de-Seine
May 1842 events
1840s in Paris